Teniola Apata  (born 23 December 1993), professionally known as Teni The Entertainer is a Nigerian singer, songwriter and entertainer.

Early life 

Teni was born on 23 December 1992 in Lagos State. She is the younger sister of Nigerian singer Niniola. She attended Apata Memorial High School and later preceded to The University of Georgia, but finished at American InterContinental University where she obtained degree in business administration.

Career

2016-2019: Fargin, Askamaya and Other Recordings 

Teni released her debut single "Amen" while signed to Shizzi's Magic Fingers Records. She left the record label and signed with Dr. Dolor Entertainment in 2017. Teni started gaining prominence after releasing the single "Fargin" in September 2017. She made her breakthrough after releasing the hit singles "Askamaya", "Case" and "Uyo Meyo". "Askamaya" was ranked 15th on MTV Base's year-end list of the Top 20 Hottest Naija Tracks of 2018.

On 20 February 2019, Teni was featured on YouTube Music's Trending Artist on the Rise. On 3 May 2019, she released the video for "Sugar Mummy". On 14 June 2019, she released a new single titled "Power Rangers".

2019-2020: Billionaire E.P and Quarantine Playlist 

Teni released her debut E.P, Billionaire on 11 October 2019. The “Billionaire EP” was compiled with six (6) tracks and no guest appearance. The E.P was produced by Jaysynths Beatz and Pheelz.

In April 2020, Teni partnered with Nigerian Disk Jockey, DJ Neptune to release an EP called the Quarantine Playlist, which sees her playing out different stages of being in quarantine and talking about the strains of being on lock down due to the coronavirus pandemic. The four-track EP is mostly mid-tempo and includes production from Tempoe, P. Prime and Dëra.

2021-present: Wondaland 

On 2 February 2021, Teni revealed the name and expected date for her forthcoming debut album. She shared this on her Instagram account "The time is near... And the album shall be called “WONDALAND” 🦋#MARCH2021 #WONDALAND" 

Her debut album 'WONDALAND' was crafted for over two years in cities like London, New York, Orlando, Ondo, Lagos and Abuja.

The album's production was handled by Pheelz, Damayo, Tempoe, P.Prime, Millamix, Krizbeatz, and Ozedikus and was made available for purchase and online streaming on several music platforms, including Apple Music, Amazon Music, Spotify, Deezer, and Google Play.

Endorsements
In March 2019, Teni signed an endorsement deal with Tom Tom, a candy brand produced by Cadbury Nigeria. On 6 October 2020, PM News reported that Teni had signed an endorsement deal with Telecommunications Giant, Globacom Nigeria.

Awards and nominations
Teni won Rookie of the Year at the 2018 Headies Awards, and Most Promising Act to Watch at the 2018 Nigeria Entertainment Awards. She also won Best New Artist at the 2018 Soundcity MVP Awards Festival. NotJustOk ranked her eighth on its list of the 10 Hottest Artists In Nigeria. She was listed on Premium Times list of the Six Nigerian breakout stars, viral sensations of 2018.

In October 2022, Member of the Order of the Niger (MON), a Nigerian National award was conferred on Teni by President Muhammadu Buhari. There was a controversy on social media about her approach to receiving the award.

Discography

Studio albums and EPs
Billionaire (2019) 
The Quarantine Playlist (2020)
WONDALAND (2021)
Moslado Refix (featuring Emmyblaq)

Selected singles

Awards

See also
List of Nigerian musicians

References 

Living people
Nigerian women musicians
21st-century Nigerian musicians
21st-century women musicians
Yoruba women in business
Yoruba women musicians
1992 births